Richland is a city in Benton County, Washington, United States. It is located in southeastern Washington at the confluence of the Yakima and the Columbia Rivers. As of the 2020 census, the city's population was 60,560. Along with the nearby cities of Pasco and Kennewick, Richland is one of the Tri-Cities, and is home to the Hanford nuclear site.

History

For centuries, the village of Chemna stood at the mouth of the current Yakima River. Today that village site is called Columbia Point. From this village, the Wanapum, Yakama and Walla Walla Indians harvested the salmon runs entering the Yakima River. Captain William Clark of the Lewis and Clark Expedition visited the mouth of the Yakima River on October 17, 1805.

Formative years
In 1904–1905, W.R. Amon and his son Howard purchased  and proposed a town site on the north bank of the Yakima River. Postal authorities approved the designation of this town site as Richland in 1905, naming it for Nelson Rich, a state legislator and land developer. In 1906, the town was registered at the Benton County Courthouse. It was incorporated on April 28, 1910, as a Washington Fourth Class City.

World War II

Richland was a small farm town until the U.S. Army purchased  of land – half the size of Rhode Island – along the Columbia River during World War II, evicting the 300 residents of Richland as well as those of the now vanished towns of White Bluffs and Hanford just upriver. The army turned it into a bedroom community for the workers on its Manhattan Project facility at the nearby Hanford Engineering Works (now the Hanford site). The population increased from 300 in July and August 1943 to 25,000 by the end of World War II in August 1945. All land and buildings were owned by the government. Housing was assigned to residents and token rent was collected; families were assigned to houses or duplexes; single people were placed in apartments or barracks. Everything necessary was provided, from free bus service to light bulbs, and trees were planted in people's yards by the government. Much of the city was planned by Spokane architect Gustav Albin Pherson 
and overseen by the Army Corps of Engineers. While there 
were dormitories and barracks built at the time, prefabricated 
duplexes and single family homes are all that survive today. 
Because homes were allocated based on family size and need, 
there were a number of floorplans available. These were each 
identified by a letter of the alphabet, and so came to be known 
as alphabet houses. 

In 1954 Harold Orlando Monson was elected the first mayor of Richland and traveled to Washington, D.C., to negotiate increased rights (such as private home ownership) for citizens in military cities across the country.

Richland's link to the Army Engineers is suggested by its street nomenclature; many of the streets are named after famous engineers. The main street (George Washington Way) is named after the first president, who was a surveyor; Stevens Drive is named after John Frank Stevens, chief engineer of the Panama Canal and Stevens Pass; Goethals Drive is named after George W. Goethals, designer of the Panama Canal; and Thayer Drive is named after Sylvanus Thayer, superintendent of West Point and later founder of the Thayer School of Engineering at Dartmouth College. The rule is that if alphabet houses reside on a given street, it is named either after an engineer or a type of tree.

The end of the war
Although many of the workers moved away as the war effort wound down, some of them moved to Richland, offsetting the depopulation that might otherwise have occurred.

The Cold War boom
Fears that the Soviet Union's intentions were aggressive set off the Cold War in 1947. The capacity to produce plutonium was increased beginning in 1947. When the Soviet Union developed and tested their first nuclear weapon in 1949, the U.S. nuclear program was reinvigorated. A second post-WW II expansion began in 1950 as a result of the war in Korea. Richland's Cold War construction boom resulted in Richland's population growing to 27,000 people by 1952. Many of these people lived in a construction camp of trailers located in what is now north Richland. With time, these trailers were vacated and the core city grew. Others lived at Camp Columbia near Horn Rapids until the camp was closed in 1950.
In 2005 several dozen houses built 
in the northern part of the core city during this boom 
were added to the National Register of Historic Places as the 
Gold Coast Historic District.

Transition to private property
The government got out of the landlord business in 1957 when the real estate was sold to the residents. Most of the people lived in duplexes; senior tenants were given the option to purchase the building; junior tenants were given the option to purchase lots in a newly platted area of north Richland. Richland was incorporated in 1958 as a chartered First Class City, an open self-governed city. As part of the transition, large areas of undeveloped land became city property. Richland's financial dependency on the federal Hanford facility changed little at this time because Hanford's mission as a weapons materials production site continued during the Cold War years.

Unclassified Hanford
 
At some point, documents and photographs of the Hanford military facilities became declassified by the U.S. government. Those digitized records are considered to be in the public domain, and are hosted on the online Hanford Document Retrieval System.
Historical events, such as a visit to the property by President Richard Nixon, are also stored on the database.

After the production boom

With the shutdown of the last production reactor in 1987, the area transitioned to environmental cleanup and technology. Now, many Richland residents are employed at the Hanford site in its environmental cleanup mission.

Richland High School's sports teams are called the Bombers, complete with a mushroom cloud logo. Some of the streets platted after 1958 are named after U.S. Army generals (such as Patton Street, MacArthur Street, Sherman Street, and Pershing Avenue) and after various nuclear themes (Einstein Avenue, Curie Street, Proton Lane, Log Lane, and Nuclear Lane). A local museum, the Reach Museum, 
tells the story of the cultural, natural, and scientific history of the Hanford Reach and Columbia Basin area; it replaced the
now closed Columbia River Exhibition of History, Science, and Technology (CREHST) in 2014.

Washington State University, Tri-Cities was founded in northern Richland in 1989, growing out of a former Joint Graduate Center which had been affiliated with the University of Washington, Oregon State University, and Washington State University. Richland is also home to Kadlec Regional Medical Center. Columbia Basin College's Medical Training Center is near Kadlec Regional Medical Center.

Government
The city of Richland is a full-service city providing police services, fire protection, water utility services, solid waste services, electric utilities, parks and recreational facilities and services, maintenance of city streets and public facilities, and full library services featuring a state-of-the-art library operated by the city. The city pursues community and economic development and offers housing assistance. 
 

The Richland Community Center is adjacent to Howard Amon Park, on the east side of the Columbia River. The building was designed by ARC Architects of Seattle, Washington. Many of its rooms have views of the park and Columbia River, which make it a venue for weddings and receptions, family reunions, birthday parties, business, and community meetings. The rooms are also used for a variety of general education and personal enrichment classes including courses in computer/technology, health & fitness, dance, arts & crafts, dog training, home & gardening, language lessons, and martial arts. The Community Center also serves as a gathering place for group recreation and gaming: cribbage, pinochle, bridge, pool, dominoes, and a host of other social activities are available to the public at large.

More recently, the Richland Community Center has hosted a number of important civic events including the Green Living Awards and the Fall Carnival.

As of 2016 the city was planning to rebuild its current city hall to across Jadwin Avenue into the parking lot of the United States Federal courthouse. This decision also includes moving the fire station, which is currently across George Washington Way, to the current site of city hall. The current city hall would be sold to eligible businesses.

Police services
The City of Richland Police Department comprises approximately 58 commissioned police officers and 15 support staff.

Economy

Technology
After the end of World War II Richland continued to be a center of production and research into nuclear energy and related technology.

It has been the home of Pacific Northwest National Laboratory (PNNL) since 1965. One of the two Laser Interferometer Gravitational-Wave Observatory sites is located immediately north of Richland. Numerous smaller high technology business and expert consultants have grown up around the Richland technology center as well.

Preferred Freezer Services Warehouse
Richland is home to the largest cold-storage facility on Earth—which is also one of the largest buildings on Earth by volume.

Major Employers
 Battelle Memorial Institute, operating PNNL
 Bechtel National Inc., building a waste vitrification plant
  Washington River Protection Solutions (a partnership of Amentum, Atkins, and Orano), controlling operations of the nuclear waste tank farms
 Washington Closure Hanford (a partnership of AECOM, Bechtel, and CH2M Hill), providing waste management and cleanup efforts, including decontamination and demolition (D&D) of facilities along the Columbia River
 Hanford Mission Integrated Solutions (a partnership of Leidos, Centerra Group, and Parsons) providing infrastructure and sitewide services
 Central Plateau Cleanup Company (a partnership of Amentum, Atkins, and Fluor), responsible for D&D of facilities on the site's Central Plateau
 EnergySolutions, providing services to the U.S. government
 Energy Northwest, generating nuclear power at a nearby reactor facility
 Framatome creating nuclear fuel
 Lockheed Martin Services, Inc., providing technology services
 The U.S. Department of Energy, which operates the Hanford Site

Agriculture
Agriculture is important in the Richland area; the Tri-Cities area of the Columbia Basin grows excellent produce. Richland hosts an important food processor, Lamb Weston, which processes potatoes and other foods.

The production of wine in the lower Columbia Basin has become one of the area's main industries. Richland lies at the center of a viticulture area which produces internationally recognized wines in four major Washington appellations and serves as a center for wine tours. The Columbia Valley appellation which surrounds Richland contains over 7,000 hectares planted with wine grapes. On the west the Yakima Valley appellation includes 5,000 hectares. To the east, the Walla Walla Valley appellation includes 500 hectares of wine grapes.

Business and industry
The Tri-City Industrial Development Council promotes both agricultural related and technology related industries in the region.

Top employers
According to Richland's 2021 Comprehensive Annual Financial Report, the top employers in the city are:

Education
The Richland School District serves the cities of Richland and West Richland with ten elementary schools, four middle schools, and three high schools.

Columbia Basin College, primarily located in Pasco, has a small branch campus in Richland.

Washington State University, Tri-Cities, established in North Richland in 1989, sits on the western bank of the Columbia River. The university offers undergraduate and graduate degree programs. It first admitted freshmen and sophomores in the fall of 2007.

Recreation

Golf

There are three 18-hole golf courses and one 9-hole course in the area.

Outdoor activities
Richland has developed a number of parks, several of them fronting on the Columbia and Yakima Rivers. The rivers provide boating, water skiing, fishing, kayaking and waterfowl hunting opportunities.

Richland is included in a bike trail system in the Tri-Cities which is named The Sacagawea Heritage Trail. The trail is a scenic river ride along the Columbia River through the Tri-Cities of Kennewick, Richland and Pasco. It is a 23-mile multipurpose blacktop loop trail on both sides of the river from Sacagawea State Park at the confluence of the Snake and Columbia Rivers up to the I-182 bridge at the Columbia Point Marina on the upper end. Three bridges join the trails on both sides, providing a number of ride options. There are numerous trailheads and access parking spots along the route.

Richland lies within a semi-arid, shrub-steppe environment, and has a number of interesting natural areas within or adjacent to the city:
 The Yakima River delta and wetlands lie within Richland and provide habitat for many birds and animals. The area around the Yakima delta provides a wooded variation of the normal shrub-steppe.
 The Badger Mountain Centennial Preserve protects Badger Mountain, located on the edge of Richland in the Richland GMA area. It provides views of the Tri-Cities as well as the Columbia and Yakima rivers. A non-profit group, Friends of Badger Mountain, worked to procure this shrub-steppe area that has the most native vegetation intact, and in 2005 built a trail to the summit. The 2-kilometer trail rises 300 meters above the trailhead in Richland.
 The Arid Lands Ecology Reserve, at the western edge of Richland on the Hanford Reservation, is the last remaining large block of undisturbed shrub-steppe habitat in the Pacific Northwest. The site has been closed to the public since the 1940s, preserving its character. It is managed as an environmental research area and wildlife reserve.
 North of Richland, the Hanford Reach, the last free-flowing stretch of the Columbia River in the U.S., provides sightseeing and salmon fishing. This free-flowing stretch flows through the Hanford Reach National Monument, which was created by Presidential proclamation in 2000, and is managed by the U.S. Fish and Wildlife Service. Volunteers are working to construct an interpretive center on Richland's Columbia Point at the confluence of the Yakima and Columbia; in 2006, $22M of the necessary funds were in hand and construction was expected later that year.
 The Amon Creek Natural Preserve in the south part of town protects wetlands around the creek and has several trails.

Sports
Sports teams in the immediate area include the Tri-City Americans WHL ice hockey team (which plays in Kennewick), and the Tri-City Dust Devils Single-A baseball team (affiliated with the Los Angeles Angels) which plays in Pasco.

Washington State University Tri-Cities has a number of club sports teams, including in rugby (2016 Northwest Cup Champions), volleyball, men's soccer and women's soccer.

Geography
Richland is located at  (46.279657, −119.281377).

In the late 1970s, Richland sought to annex  of unincorporated land in Franklin County on the east side of the Columbia River, anticipating development following the construction of Interstate 182. The move was blocked by Pasco, who had planned to annex much of the area themselves. The Richland city government filed an appeal against the Franklin County Boundary Review Board in 1983 following their approval of Pasco's claim; the Washington Supreme Court affirmed the Franklin County decision.

Climate
Summers are hot with infrequent thunderstorms, while winters are milder than all of Eastern Washington with snow falling only occasionally.

Demographics

Based on per capita income, one of the more reliable measures of affluence, Richland ranks 83rd of 522 areas ranked in the state of Washington—the highest rank achieved in Benton County.

2010 census
As of the census of 2010, there were 48,058 people, 19,707 households, and 12,974 families residing in the city. The racial makeup of the city was 87.0% White, 1.4% African American, 0.8% Native American, 4.7% Asian, 0.1% Pacific Islander, 2.7% from other races, and 3.2% from two or more races. Hispanic or Latino people of any race were 7.8% of the population.

There were 19,707 households, of which 31.0% had children under the age of 18 living with them, 51.6% were married couples living together, 10.0% had a female householder with no husband present, 4.2% had a male householder with no wife present, and 34.2% were non-families. 28.2% of all households were made up of individuals, and 10.1% had someone living alone who was 65 years of age or older. The average household size was 2.42 and the average family size was 2.97.

The median age in the city was 39.4 years. 24.2% of residents were under the age of 18; 8.1% were between the ages of 18 and 24; 24.7% were from 25 to 44; 28.4% were from 45 to 64; and 14.6% were 65 years of age or older. The gender makeup of the city was 49.0% male and 51.0% female.

2000 census
As of the 2000 census, there were 38,708 people, 15,549 households, and 10,682 families residing in the city. The population density was 1,111.8 people per square mile (429.2/km2). There were 16,458 housing units at an average density of 472.7 per square mile (182.5/km2). The racial makeup of the city was 89.55% White, 1.37% African American, 0.76% Native American, 4.06% Asian, 0.11% Pacific Islander, 1.85% from other races, and 2.31% from two or more races. Hispanic or Latino people of any race were 4.72% of the population.

There were 15,549 households, out of which 34.1% had children under the age of 18 living with them, 56% were married couples living together, 9.3% had a female householder with no husband present, and 31.3% were non-families. 27.2% of all households were made up of individuals, and 9.4% had someone living alone who was 65 years of age or older. The average household size was 2.48 and the average family size was 3.02.

In the city the population was spread out, with 27.2% under the age of 18, 7.5% from 18 to 24, 27.1% from 25 to 44, 25.4% from 45 to 64, and 12.8% who were 65 years of age or older. The median age was 38 years. For every 100 females, there were 96 males. For every 100 females age 18 and over, there were 93.2 males.

The median income for a household in the city was $53,092, and the median income for a family was $82,354 (Money CNN). Males had a median income of $52,648 versus $30,472 for females. The per capita income for the city was $25,494. About 5.7% of families and 8.2% of the population were below the poverty line, including 10.8% of those under age 18 and 5.6% of those age 65 or over.

Transportation
Richland is served by Richland Airport, located in the city, as well as the Tri-Cities Airport, located in nearby Pasco. Both have only domestic flights. Also in Pasco is an Amtrak station, where the Portland-Chicago Empire Builder makes a stop.

Ben Franklin Transit provides bus transportation within Richland and the Tri-Cities area.

Notable people
 James (Jim) F. Albaugh – Executive Vice President, The Boeing Company, RHS class of 1968
 Stu Barnes – NHL former player and coach; lives in Richland; an owner of the Tri-City Americans along with Olaf Kolzig
 Kayla Barron – NASA astronaut
 Beefy – nerdcore artist; real name Keith A. Moore
 Tyler Brayton – National Football League defensive end for the Carolina Panthers
 Travis Buck – San Diego Padres outfielder
 Orson Scott Card – science fiction writer; born in Richland but his family moved away soon after
 Gene Conley – Major League Basketball and Baseball player, RHS
 Larry Coryell – jazz guitarist, RHS class of 1961
 Westley Allan Dodd – serial killer and child molester; RHS class of 1979; hanged January 5, 1993
 Santino Fontana – Broadway and film actor; RHS class of 2000; Nominated for the 2013 Tony Award for Best Leading Actor in a Musical for his role in the revival of Cinderella. Winner of 2019 Tony Award for Best Leading Actor in a Musical for his role in Tootsie (musical).
 Ty Jones – former NHL player and first round pick in the 1997 NHL draft
 Kurt Kafentzis – former NFL defensive back
 Mark Kafentzis – former NFL defensive back
 Olaf Kölzig – retired NHL goaltender; lives in Richland; an owner of the Tri-City Americans along with Stu Barnes
 James N. Mattis – The 26th United States Secretary of Defense; General, U.S. Marine Corps; RHS class of 1968
 Mike McCormack – U.S. Representative from the Fourth Congressional District
 Jimmy McLarnin – Irish boxer, two-time welterweight world champion; International Boxing Hall of Fame inductee and who was a resident of Richland at the time of his death.
 Nate Mendel – Sunny Day Real Estate and Foo Fighters bassist; Hanford High School Class of 1987
 Michael Peterson – Country western singer
 Jason Repko – Major League Baseball outfielder; Hanford High class of 1999
 Kathryn Ruemmler – White House Counsel to President Barack Obama; RHS class of 1989
 Hope Solo – United States women's national soccer team goalkeeper; Summer Olympic gold medalist; FIFA Women's World Cup champion; RHS class of 1999
 Sharon Tate – actress; murder victim of Charles Manson's followers; Miss Richland, 1959
 John Archibald Wheeler – theoretical physicist
Rachel Willis-Sørensen—American operatic soprano raised in Richland

Sister city
Richland's sister city is:
 Hsinchu, Taiwan

See also
 Hanford High School
 Pacific Northwest National Laboratory
 Hanford Site
 Richland High School
 Richland School District
 Washington State University, Tri-Cities
 Ben Franklin Transit
 Kate Brown

References

Further reading
 Kate Brown, Plutopia: Nuclear Families, Atomic Cities, and the Great Soviet and American Plutonium Disasters. Oxford: Oxford University Press, 2013.
 Elizabeth Gibson, "Images of America: Richland," Mount Pleasant, SC: Arcadia Publishing, 2002.
 Barbara J. Kubik, Richland, Celebrating Its Heritage. Richland, WA: City of Richland, Washington, 1994.
 Paul Loeb, Nuclear Culture: Living & Working in the World's Largest Atomic Complex. Philadelphia, PA: New Society Publishers, 1986.
 Christine F. Noonan, Federal City Revisited: Atomic Energy and Community Identify in Richland, Washington. PhD dissertation. Ball State University, 2000.
 S.L. Sanger, Hanford and the Bomb: An Oral History of World War II. Seattle, WA: Living History Press, 1989.

External links

 Hanford Reach National Monument
 Plutopia: Nuclear Families, Atomic Cities, and the Great Soviet and American Plutonium Disasters

 
 
1905 establishments in Washington (state)
Cities in Benton County, Washington
Cities in Washington (state)
Manhattan Project sites
World War II Heritage Cities
Populated places established in 1905
Washington (state) populated places on the Columbia River
Populated places on the Yakima River